Polona Batagelj (born 7 June 1989) is a Slovenian former road bicycle racer, who rode professionally between 2010 and 2018 for the ,  (two spells) and  squads. She most recently worked as a directeur sportif for her final professional team, UCI Women's Team . She won the Slovenian National Road Race Championships nine times, successively between 2010 and 2018.

She competed at the 2012 Summer Olympics in the Women's road race, finishing 22nd. At the 2016 Olympics, she finished in 32nd in the women's road race. She was on the start list for 2018 European Road Cycling Championships and finished 27th.

Personal life

Major results

2009
 National Road Championships
2nd Time trial
3rd Road race
2010
 National Road Championships
1st  Road race
3rd Time trial
2011
 National Road Championships
1st  Road race
2nd Time trial
 7th Overall Giro della Toscana Int. Femminile – Memorial Michela Fanini
 8th Overall Iurreta-Emakumeen Bira
 8th Overall Giro del Trentino Alto Adige-Südtirol
 8th Durango-Durango Emakumeen Saria
2012
 1st  Road race, National Road Championships
2013
 National Road Championships
1st  Road race
2nd Time trial
2014
 National Road Championships
1st  Road race
1st  Time trial
2015
 National Road Championships
1st  Road race
1st  Time trial
 3rd Overall Auensteiner–Radsporttage
 6th Overall La Route de France
 7th Overall Gracia–Orlová
2016
 1st  Road race, National Road Championships
 9th SwissEver GP Cham-Hagendorn
 9th La Classique Morbihan
2017
 National Road Championships
1st  Road race
2nd Time trial
 4th Giro dell'Emilia Internazionale Donne Elite
 10th Winston-Salem Cycling Classic
 10th GP de Plouay – Bretagne
2018
 National Road Championships
1st  Road race
3rd Time trial
 9th Giro dell'Emilia Internazionale Donne Elite
 10th Overall Madrid Challenge by La Vuelta

References

External links

1989 births
Living people
Slovenian female cyclists
Olympic cyclists of Slovenia
Cyclists at the 2012 Summer Olympics
Cyclists at the 2016 Summer Olympics
Cyclists at the 2015 European Games
European Games competitors for Slovenia
People from Šempeter pri Gorici